Martin Grüner (19 July 1929 – 4 February 2018) was a  German politician and member of the Free Democratic Party (FDP). Hailing from Schramberg, he was Parliamentary Secretary at the Economics Ministry from 1972 to 1987 and then Parliamentary Secretary at the  Environment Ministry until 1991.

References

 Announcement of Awards of Merit of the Federal Republic of Germany. In: Federal Gazette, No. 172, 13 September 1978.

1929 births
2018 deaths
People from Schramberg
Grand Crosses with Star and Sash of the Order of Merit of the Federal Republic of Germany
Members of the Bundestag for Baden-Württemberg
Members of the Bundestag 1990–1994
Members of the Bundestag 1987–1990
Members of the Bundestag 1983–1987
Members of the Bundestag 1980–1983
Members of the Bundestag 1976–1980
Members of the Bundestag 1972–1976
Members of the Bundestag 1969–1972
Members of the Bundestag for the Free Democratic Party (Germany)
Parliamentary State Secretaries of Germany